Keller is an unincorporated community in Riley Township, Vigo County, in the U.S. state of Indiana. It is part of the Terre Haute metropolitan area. Part of the old general store is still standing, but all other businesses have been torn down. Keller is exclusively a residential community today.

History
Keller was known as Ferrell until 1903. A post office was established under this name in 1903, was renamed to Keller that same year, and was discontinued in 1913.

Geography

References

Unincorporated communities in Indiana
Unincorporated communities in Vigo County, Indiana
Terre Haute metropolitan area